is a Japanese football player. He plays for Fujieda MYFC.

Career
Takuya Ohata joined J1 League club Júbilo Iwata in 2009. In 2011, he entered Juntendo University. In 2015, he joined Japan Football League club Azul Claro Numazu. In 2017, he moved to J3 League club SC Sagamihara.

Club statistics
Updated to 22 February 2020.

References

External links

Profile at Júbilo Iwata
Profile at SC Sagamihara

1990 births
Living people
Juntendo University alumni
Association football people from Mie Prefecture
Japanese footballers
J1 League players
J3 League players
Japan Football League players
Júbilo Iwata players
Azul Claro Numazu players
SC Sagamihara players
Fujieda MYFC players
Association football goalkeepers